The Napa Silverados were a professional baseball team based in Napa, California, United States, and were members of the Pacific Association of Professional Baseball Clubs, an independent professional baseball circuit not affiliated with Major League Baseball.  The team was founded in summer 2017 by Napa area businessman Bruce Johnston, but was sold to Napa Professional Baseball Company, consisting of David Halloran, Tito Fuentes Jr. (son of former San Francisco Giants player Tito Fuentes), and Alma Eugenio Fuentes on March 20, 2019. They played their home games at Miner Family Field.

Season records

References

External links
 Napa Silverados official website

Pacific Association of Professional Baseball Clubs teams
North American League teams
Professional baseball teams in California
Napa, California
Sports teams in the San Francisco Bay Area
2017 establishments in California
Baseball teams established in 2017